The government of Alberta is the body responsible for the administration of the Canadian province of Alberta. As a constitutional monarchy, the Crown—represented in the province by the lieutenant governor—is the corporation sole, assuming distinct roles: the executive, as the Crown-in-Council; the legislature, as the Crown-in-Parliament; and the courts, as the Crown-on-the-Bench. The functions of the government are exercised on behalf of three institutions—the Executive Council; the Legislative Assembly; and the judiciary, respectively. Its powers and structure are partly set out in the Constitution Act, 1867.

Alberta operates in the Westminster system of government. The political party or coalition that wins the largest number of seats in the legislature forms government, and the party's leader becomes premier of Alberta and ministers are selected by the premier.

In modern Canadian use, the term Government of Alberta refers specifically to the executive—political ministers of the Crown (the Cabinet/Executive Council) who are appointed on the advice of the premier. Ministers direct the non-partisan civil service, who staff ministries and agencies to deliver government policies, programs, and services. The executive corporately brands itself as the Government of Alberta, or more formally, His Majesty's Government of Alberta.

The Crown 

As a Commonwealth realm, the Canadian monarch is shared with 14 other independent countries within the Commonwealth of Nations. Within Canada, the monarch exercises power individually on behalf of the federal government, and the 10 provinces.

The powers of the Crown are vested in the monarch and are exercised by the lieutenant governor. The advice of the premier and Executive Council is typically binding; the Constitution Act, 1867 requires executive power to be exercised only "by and with the Advice of the Executive Council".

Lieutenant Governor 

The lieutenant governor is appointed by the governor general, on the advice of the prime minister of Canada. Thus, it is typically the lieutenant governor whom the premier and ministers advise, exercising much of the royal prerogative and granting royal assent.

Powers and function 

While the advice of the premier and Executive Council is typically binding on the lieutenant governor, there are occasions when the lieutenant governor has refused advice. This usually occurs if the premier does not clearly command the confidence of the elected Legislative Assembly, or if the advice or legislation would be unconstitutional.

Federally, a notable instance occurred in 1926, known as the King-Byng Affair, when Governor General Lord Byng of Vimy refused Prime Minister Mackenzie King's request to dissolve the federal Parliament to call for a general election. 

More recently, on a provincial level in the British Columbia following the 2017 provincial election, Premier Christy Clark met with Lieutenant Governor Judith Guichon and advised dissolution of the Legislature. Guichon declined Clark’s request. Clark then offered her resignation as Premier, and the leader of the Official Opposition, John Horgan, who was able to command the confidence of the elected Legislature, was invited to form the government.

In 2022, Lieutenant Governor Salma Lakhani identified the constitutional role of the lieutenant governor as the most important part of the job. She stated "We are a constitutional monarchy, and this is where we do checks and balances. I’m what I would call a ‘constitutional fire extinguisher.’ We don’t have to use it a lot, but sometimes we do have to use it," in response to a proposed "Alberta Sovereignty Act" if it was determined to be unconstitutional. The proposed law would give the province the ability to ignore federal legislation it does not agree with.

Executive power
The executive power is vested in the Crown and exercised "in-Council", meaning on the advice of the Executive Council; conventionally, this is the Cabinet, which is chaired by the premier and comprises ministers of the Crown. The term Government of Alberta, or more formally,  Majesty's Government refers to the activities of the Lieutenant Governor-in-Council. The day-to-day operation and activities of the Government of Alberta are performed by the provincial departments and agencies, staffed by the non-partisan public service, and directed by the elected government.

Premier 

The premier of Alberta is the primary minister of the Crown. The premier acts as the head of government for the province, chairs and selects the membership of the Cabinet, and advises the Crown on the exercise of executive power and much of the royal prerogative. As premiers hold office by virtue of their ability to command the confidence of the elected Legislative Assembly, they typically sit as a member of the Legislative Assembly (MLA) and lead the largest party or a coalition in the Assembly. Once sworn in, the premier holds office until either they resign or removed by the lieutenant governor after either a motion of no confidence or defeat in a general election.

Danielle Smith has served as Premier since October 11, 2022, when she won the leadership of her United Conservative Party.

Legislative power

The Legislative Assembly of Alberta is the deliberative assembly of the Alberta Legislature for the province of Alberta, Canada, and is seated at the Alberta Legislature Building in the provincial capital of Edmonton. The Legislative Assembly is a unicameral assembly of 87 members, elected first past the post from single-member electoral districts. Bills passed by the legislature are given Royal Assent by Charles III, King of Canada, represented by the Lieutenant-Governor of Alberta. The current Legislature is the 30th, since Alberta entered Confederation under the Alberta Act in 1905, and is composed of members elected in the April 16, 2019 general election, and returned a majority parliament controlled by the United Conservative Party commonly abbreviated to 'UCP'.

See also 
Politics of Alberta

References

External links
 Official Site